†Protorculidae is an extinct family of fossil sea snails, marine gastropod mollusks in the clade Caenogastropoda.

Genera
Genera within the family Protoculidae include:
 Anulifera
 Battenizyga
 Chulitnacula
 Moerkeia
 Protorcula

References

 The Taxonomicon

Prehistoric gastropods